Neil Manthorp is a British-born South African writer. Based in Cape Town, he is best known internationally for his coverage of cricket. He writes for the Telegraph and the Daily Mail.

Biography
Manthorp was born and educated in England, but considers himself very much a South African. When he was a year old, his parents emigrated from the North of England and Manthorp spent his formative years in South Africa before returning to England to complete his schooling. With South Africa isolated in sport due to apartheid, he stayed on in Britain and began his journalistic career in 1986, commentating and writing freelance.

With the end of apartheid in 1990, he decided to return to South Africa, where he set up his own sports agency, MWP Media, in 1992.

He has stayed there ever since, apart from the necessary travel required to follow sport, which has taken him to all the cricketing corners of the world.

He has a YouTube account where you can watch him travelling.

Career
He has covered more than 40 tours and 120 Test matches since South Africa's return to international cricket and Zimbabwe's elevation to Test status.

He is a regular commentator for SABC radio and television and has also joined the host radio teams in West Indies, New Zealand, Australia and England. He writes for newspapers and magazines and recently completed his fifth book "The Proteas: 20 Years, 20 Landmark matches" marking the 20th anniversary of South Africa's return to international cricket. He is commentating for Talksport on the 2018 England tour of Sri Lanka.

As well as cricket, he also writes on golf and rugby.

Bibliography
Gazza: the Gary Kirsten biography 
The Beer Drinker's Guide to Losing Weight, (with Paddy Upton), The Penguin Group (SA) (Pty) Ltd,  
Graeme Smith: A Captain's Diary 2007-2009, Jonathan Ball Publishers,  
Taking the Mickey: the Mickey Arthur biography, Jonathan Ball Publishers,  
The Proteas: 20 Years, 20 Landmark Matches, Burnet Media, 
Bouch: Through My Eyes, Jonathan Ball Publishers,

External links
Articles on SuperCricket
Articles on Cricinfo

References

Living people
South African cricket commentators
South African people of British descent
Year of birth missing (living people)